The Deva is a river in Northern Spain, flowing through the Autonomous Communities of Cantabria and Asturias until it flows into Tina Mayor, an estuary. Its main tributaries are the Cares and Urdón rivers, among others.

Deva is the name of a Celtic goddess related to the waters. As the names of the English rivers Dee, which are related, this may come from the Proto-Indo-European *deiueh2-, meaning 'a goddess'.

See also 
 List of rivers of Spain

Rivers of Spain
Rivers of Cantabria
Rivers of Asturias
Picos de Europa